The Arab National Council was an alliance of once warring Arabian tribes formed after the victorious uprising against nearly 400 years of Ottoman rule over Syria. T. E. Lawrence was instrumental in establishing this provisional Arab government under King Faisal, Lawrence had hoped to bring about independence from foreign colonialism by uniting the Arabs. Faisal's rule as king, however, came to an abrupt end in 1920, after the battle of Maysaloun, when the French Forces of General Gouraud, under the command of General Mariano Goybet, entered Damascus, destroying Lawrence's dream of being lauded for laying the foundations of an independent Arabian rule over Syria. The council disbanded in the 1930s.

See also
Arab Kingdom of Syria
Arab nationalism
Arab Revolt
Lawrence of Arabia (film)
Sykes–Picot Agreement
Arab League

References

1918 establishments in the Ottoman Empire
Arab history
Arab nationalism in the Ottoman Empire
Arab nationalist organizations
National liberation movements